Walter Kelley may refer to:

Walter T. Kelley (1897–1986), American publisher of Modern Beekeeping
Walter A. Kelley (1907–2000), American Thoroughbred horse racing trainer
Walter Kelley (born 1922), American actor and screenwriter (Men in War#Cast)
Walter D. Kelley Jr. (born 1955), American jurist for Eastern District of Virginia

See also
Walter Kelly (disambiguation)